Rupert State Forest covers  in Rupert, Vermont in Bennington County. The forest is managed by the Vermont Department of Forests, Parks, and Recreation. It consists of two parcels located on the Rupert-Dorset town line that were a gift to the state in 1959, along with another 27 acres from the state in 2013.

There is no legal right-of-way to these lands.

References

External links
Official website

Vermont state forests
Protected areas of Bennington County, Vermont
Rupert, Vermont